The Basketball Association of America (BAA) was a professional basketball league in North America, founded in 1946. Following its third season, 1948–49, the BAA absorbed most of National Basketball League (NBL) and rebranded as the National Basketball Association (NBA).

The Philadelphia Warriors won the inaugural BAA championship in 1947, followed by the Baltimore Bullets and the Minneapolis Lakers in 1948 and 1949, respectively. Six teams from the BAA remain in operation in the NBA as of the 2021–22 season, three that co-founded the league in 1946 and three that joined it from the NBL in 1948 (below). The inaugural BAA season began with 11 teams, of which four dropped out before the second season. One ABL team joined to provide 8 teams for 1947–48 and four NBL teams joined to provide 12 for 1948–49. The records and statistics of the BAA and NBL prior to the merger in 1949 are considered in official NBA history only if a player, coach or team participated in the newly formed NBA after 1949 for one or more seasons.

The NBA generally claims the BAA's history as its own. For example, at NBA History online its table of one-line "NBA Season Recaps" begins 1946–47 without comment. It celebrated "NBA at 50" in 1996, with the announcement of its 50 Greatest Players among other things.

History

When the BAA was founded there were two established professional leagues in the United States: the American Basketball League in the East, founded 1925, and the National Basketball League in Midwestern industrial cities, founded 1937.  However, most of the ABL and NBL teams played in small arenas, and in some cases even ballrooms or high school gymnasiums.  Walter Brown, owner of the Boston Garden, believed that major ice hockey arenas, which sat empty on many nights, could be put to profitable use hosting basketball games when there were no ice hockey games to be played. To put this theory into practice, the BAA was founded in New York City on June 6, 1946. Maurice Podoloff, who was already serving as president of the American Hockey League, was appointed president of the BAA, becoming the first person to simultaneously lead two professional leagues (Joseph Carr had been president of the ABL from 1925 to 1928 while also overseeing the National Football League, although the NFL and ABL seasons did not overlap).

The owners of the BAA, while experienced businessmen, had little experience owning basketball teams. The league started with 11 teams, which played a 60-game regular season. This was followed by the playoffs and the final series to determine the league winner.

Although there had been earlier attempts at professional basketball leagues, including the American Basketball League (ABL) and the NBL, the BAA was the first league that attempted to play primarily in large arenas in major cities, such as Madison Square Garden and Boston Garden. At its inception, the quality of play in the BAA was not significantly better than in competing leagues, or among leading independent clubs such as the Harlem Globetrotters. For instance, both the 1948 and 1949 titles were won by teams that had played in other leagues during the previous year, the Baltimore Bullets in 1948 and the Minneapolis Lakers in 1949.

1946–47 season

The league started with 11 teams, which were divided into two divisions, the Eastern Division and the Western Division. Each team played 60 or 61 regular season games. The best three teams from each division advanced to the playoffs. The two division winners received first-round byes and qualified directly to the semifinals, while the two second-place teams and two third-place teams competed in the best-of-3 quarterfinals, followed by the semifinals. The final series was also played in a best-of-7 format.

On November 1, 1946, at Maple Leaf Gardens in Toronto, the Toronto Huskies hosted the New York Knickerbockers, which the NBA now regards as the league's first official game. In the opening game of the BAA, Ossie Schectman scored the opening basket for the Knickerbockers. The Eastern Division winner, the Washington Capitols, who had the best record with 49 wins, were defeated in the best-of-7 semifinal by the Western Division winner, the Chicago Stags. The Stags advanced to the finals along with the Philadelphia Warriors who defeated the New York Knickerbockers in the other semifinal. The Warriors won the inaugural BAA championship by winning the series 4–1.

The first year had many problems. In arenas shared with hockey teams, some arena owners simply put a wooden basketball floor over the ice. This caused some games to be cancelled due to puddles on the floor. In addition, some owners would not heat their buildings, leading fans to bring blankets to the games and players to wear gloves. Attendance averaged just 3,000 per game. Teams with large leads would stall by having players dribble the ball for long periods. The owners discussed trying a 60-minute game and even  doing "innings" where each team would have the ball for a certain period of time. In addition, the teams in the league were financially weak. However, the BAA still had fans eager to see former college stars play.

From the beginning, the league aspired to be a major league. The league also differed from its rival, the National Basketball League. The BAA played a 48-minute game instead of a 40-minute game, and allowed players to play until they committed six fouls as opposed to five. The league formation did not alarm team owners in the NBL until  some NBL players switched to the BAA.

1947–48 season

Before the season started, the Cleveland Rebels, Detroit Falcons, Pittsburgh Ironmen and Toronto Huskies folded, leaving the BAA with only seven teams. The Baltimore Bullets joined the league from the ABL, and were assigned to the Western Division along with the Washington Capitols to even the divisions. Prior to the start of the season, the league held its inaugural college draft on July 1, 1947. Each team played 48 regular season games. The Eastern Division was won by the Philadelphia Warriors, the West by the St. Louis Bombers.

The 1948 Playoffs followed the same format as the previous year. The Eastern Division winner, the Philadelphia Warriors defeated the Western Division winner, St. Louis Bombers. In the finals, the Warriors were defeated by the Bullets 4–2.

1948–49 season

Prior to the start of the season, four teams from the NBL, the Fort Wayne Pistons, Indianapolis Jets, Minneapolis Lakers and the Rochester Royals, joined the BAA. This caused a surge in talent as players such as George Mikan were now playing in the BAA. With twelve teams, the league was realigned into two six-team divisions. Each team played 60 regular season games. The Eastern Division was won by the Washington Capitols who had 38 wins, while the Western Division was dominated by the two new teams, the Royals and the Lakers who had 45 and 44 wins respectively.

The 1949 Playoffs were expanded to include eight teams. The four best teams from each division contested in divisional semifinals and divisional finals to find each division winners. The two division winners then advanced to the finals. The divisional semifinals and finals were played in a best-of-3 format while the final series were played in the best-of-7 format. The Lakers defeated the Royals to become the inaugural Western Division winner. In the other divisional final, the Capitols defeated the New York Knicks to become the inaugural Eastern Division winner. The Lakers then won the finals by defeating the Capitols 4–2.

Absorption of NBL, and rebranding as NBA

On August 3, 1949, the BAA agreed to merge with the NBL, creating the National Basketball Association (NBA). Six remaining NBL teams joined with the ten BAA teams; the Indianapolis Jets and the Providence Steamrollers folded prior to the absorption. The Indianapolis Olympians, a planned expansion team for the NBL, also joined the newly formed league. In total, the new league had 17 teams located in a mix of large and small cities, as well as large arenas, smaller gymnasiums, and armories. Prior to the merge, the league held the 1949 college draft on March 21, which was the last event held under the name BAA.

The NBA claims the BAA's history as its own. It reckons the 1949 deal as an expansion, not a merger, and does not recognize NBL records.

League championships

The series was initially known as the BAA Finals prior to the 1949–50 season when the Basketball Association of America (BAA) absorbed the National Basketball League (NBL) and rebranded as NBA.

Teams

 Not affiliated with the present-day Washington Wizards, which were known as the Baltimore Bullets from 1963 to 1973, Baltimore moved from the NBL to the BAA in 1947.
 Known as the Detroit Pistons since 1957, Fort Wayne moved from the NBL to the BAA in 1948.
 Known as the Los Angeles Lakers since 1960, Minneapolis moved from the NBL to the BAA in 1948.
 Known as the Golden State Warriors since 1971, Philadelphia relocated to San Francisco in 1962.
 Known as the Sacramento Kings since 1985, Rochester moved from the NBL to the BAA in 1948 (and relocated three times).
 Not affiliated with National Hockey League Washington Capitals
 Indianapolis moved from the NBL to the BAA in 1948, along with three other teams that remain in operation.

Annual standings

1946–47 

Eastern Division

Western Division

1947–48 

Eastern Division

Western Division

1948–49 

Eastern Division

Western Division

Awards

The All-BAA Team was an annual BAA honor bestowed on the best players in the league following every season. The All-BAA Team was composed of two five-man lineups—a first and second team, comprising a total of 10 roster spots. The players were selected without regard to position.

References

External links 
 NBA History at NBA.com
 BAA history NBAHoopsonline

 
Basketball leagues in Canada
1946 establishments in the United States
Sports leagues established in 1946